De Hoog is a Dutch surname. Translating as "the high", the origin of the surname is most often toponymic, referring to a higher location, but could also be descriptive for an eminent person. People with this surname include:

Bernard de Hoog (1867–1943), Dutch painter
Bryan de Hoog (born 1988), Dutch darts player 
Dick de Hoog (1873–1939), Dutch politician, President of the Indo European Alliance
Ellen Hoog (born 1986), Dutch field hockey player
Henk de Hoog (1918–1973), Dutch racing cyclist
Pieter de Hoogh (1629–1684), Dutch genre painter
Robert de Hoog (born 1944), Dutch social scientist 
Robert de Hoog (born 1988), Dutch actor

See also
De Hooch, archaic spelling of the same name

References

Dutch-language surnames